The Gallaeci or Callaeci were an ancient Celtic tribe of Gallaecia, living in the northwest of modern Portugal, roughly in today's western half of the Porto District (Portuguese District = County), from the west of the Tâmega river valley to the Atlantic coast in the west and north of the Douro river. The Greek name of the tribe was Kallaikoi.

The name Gallaeci or Callaeci gave name to a large tribal confederation of the same name (the Gallaeci) in the northwest of the Iberian Peninsula, and also gave name to the region of Gallaecia (roughly today's Galicia and Northern Portugal, and also included Asturias and part of León).

Neighbouring this tribe, to the north were the Bracari and the Narbasi, to the northeast were the Narbasi and some of the Nemetati, to the east (low valley of the Tâmega river) were the Tongobrigenses, all of which were also Gallaecian tribes. To their south (south of the Douro river) were the Turduli Veteres, a tribe part of the Turduli, and to their southeast (south of the Douro river) were the Paesuri, a tribe part of the Lusitanians and to their west was the Atlantic coast.

Culturally they were part of the Late Bronze Age and Iron Age Castro Culture.

Their territory was in a strategic position at the low course of the Douro river, because land and maritime routes, including trade routes, crossed their territory between the north and the south or vice versa, and from the east to the west or vice versa.

The Roman general Decimus Junius Brutus Callaicus conquered their land and founded the Roman city Portus Cale in around 136 BC (today's Porto or Oporto city) based on or close to an older Celtic village and fortress (a Castro) that was on the top of a hill on the north bank of the Douro river close to its mouth or estuary but more to the inland.

The Place Name (Toponym) Portus Cale later would gave origin to the name Portugal (the country).

See also
Castro culture
Pre-Roman peoples of the Iberian Peninsula

References

Queiroga, Francisco (1992), War and Castros, Oxford.
Silva, Armando Coelho Ferreira da (1986), A Cultura Castreja, Porto.

External links
Detailed map of the Pre-Roman Peoples of Iberia (around 200 BC)

Tribes of Gallaecia
Galician Celtic tribes
Ancient peoples of Portugal